The Seismological Society of America (SSA) is an international scientific society devoted to the advancement of seismology and the understanding of earthquakes for the benefit of society. Founded in 1906, the society has members throughout the world representing seismologists and other geophysicists, geologists, engineers, insurers, and policy-makers in preparedness and safety.

History 
The society was established by academic, government, and other scientific and engineering professionals in the months following the April 18th San Francisco earthquake, with the first meeting of the Board of Directors taking place on December 1, 1906.

Publications 
The Seismological Society of America publishes the Bulletin of the Seismological Society of America (BSSA), a  journal of research in earthquake seismology and related disciplines since 1911, and Seismological Research Letters (SRL), which serves as a forum for informal communication among seismologists, as well as between seismologists and those non-specialists interested in seismology and related disciplines.

The Bulletin of the Seismological Society of America (BSSA), first issued in 1911, is a bimonthly peer-reviewed journal of original seismological research as well as reviews which summarize topics of seismic research. Offering highly detailed, in-depth, and theoretical treatment of its subject matter by international authors, this journal appeals to an audience of specialists in the field of seismology.

Seismological Research Letters (SRL), first issued in 1987, is a peer-reviewed journal published bimonthly both in print and online. This journal appeals to a broader international audience of geoscientists beyond seismology as well as a possible crossover audience beyond the geoscientific specialties. As such, this journal publishes both original research and, to a lesser degree, educational, historical, and emerging topics of seismological science. Original research of similar scope can be found in both journals (BSSA above and SRL), but SRL papers tend to be less theoretical and more experimental in nature, as well as more timely. 

The Seismic Record (TSR), established in 2021, publishes short peer-reviewed articles on the breadth of seismology and earthquake science. The articles, each no more than six published pages in total, cover recent events and current topics of strong significance, warranting rapid peer review and publication.

SSA follows a general policy of online open access permitting authors to post their work online at their discretion anytime 12 months after its initial publication by SSA.

Meetings 
The society hosts an annual meeting every April. The meeting is open to anyone. SSA members receive a discount on their meeting registration. The Eastern Section of SSA hosts an annual meeting each fall.

Past and future annual meetings 
 27–30 April 2021 – Virtual
 23–26 April 2019 – Seattle, Washington
 14–17 May 2018 – Miami, Florida
 18–20 April 2017 – Denver, Colorado
 20–22 April 2016 – Reno, Nevada
 21–23 April 2015 – Pasadena, California
 30 April-2 May 2014 – Anchorage, Alaska
 17–19 April 2013 – Salt Lake City, Utah
 17–19 April 2012 – San Diego, California
 13–15 April 2011 – Memphis, Tennessee
 21–23 April 2010 – Portland, Oregon
 8–10 April 2009 – Monterey, California
 16–18 April 2008 – Santa Fe, New Mexico
 11–13 April 2007 – Kona, Hawaii
 18–22 April 2006 – San Francisco, California
 27–29 April 2005 – Lake Tahoe, Nevada
 14–16 April 2004 – Palm Springs, California
 30 April-3 May 2003 – San Juan, Puerto Rico
 17–19 April 2002 – Victoria, British Columbia (Canada)
 18–20 April 2001 – San Francisco, California
 10–12 April 2000 – San Diego, California
 3–5 May 1999 – Seattle, Washington
 16–18 March 1998 – Boulder, Colorado
 9–11 April 1997 – Honolulu, Hawaii
 1–3 April 1996 – St. Louis, Missouri
 22–24 March 1995 – El Paso, Texas
 5–7 April 1994 – Pasadena, California
 14–16 April 1993 – Ixtapa-Zihuatanejo, Mexico
 14–16 April 1992 – Santa Fe, New Mexico
 25–27 March 1991 – San Francisco, California
 2–4 May 1990 – Santa Cruz, California
 16–19 May 1973 – Golden, Colorado

See also
American Geological Institute
Geological Society of America
IRIS Consortium
List of geoscience organizations

References

Sources

External links
SSA official website

Geology societies
Geophysics societies
Non-profit organizations based in California
Scientific societies based in the United States
Organizations based in Alameda County, California
Albany, California
Scientific organizations established in 1906
1906 establishments in California